This is a list of Christian religious houses, both extant and dissolved, in Norway, for both men and women. All those before the Reformation were of course Catholic; the modern ones are a mixture of Catholic and Protestant communities.



Norwegian monasteries pre-Reformation
All Norway's medieval religious houses that were still extant were dissolved during the Reformation.

Norwegian monasteries post-Reformation

All of the following are less than thirty years old.

Engen Community, Kolbu in Toten: Protestant deaconesses, of the French Communauté des Diaconesses de Reuilly 
Fjordenes Dronning Abbey, Storfjord near Stamsund and Lofoten: Cistercian monks
Heimdal Abbey: Bridgettines
Hovin in Telemark: Trappist monks
Høysteinane Priory, Larvik: Poor Clares
Lunden Convent, Linderud, Oslo: Dominican sisters
St. Dominic's Convent, Oslo: Dominican sisters
St. Hallvard's Church and Monastery, Enerhaugen, Oslo: Franciscan friars
Tautra Abbey (Tautra Mariakloster), Tautra: Trappist nuns
Totus Tuus Convent, Tromsø: Carmelite sisters

Notes

Sources
 Norske middelalderkloster 

 
Monasteries
Norway